Nowruz Beg (died 1640), was a Safavid official from the Georgian Tulashvili clan, who served during the reigns of Abbas I (1588-1629) and Safi (1629-1642). He sometime married a daughter of the prominent Safavid-Georgian military and political leader Imam-Quli Khan. In 1626-1627, Abbas I made Nowruz Beg steward of the Javanshir clan in Karabakh, while his brother-in-law Daud Khan Undiladze became governor of Karabakh itself.

Sources
 
 

1640 deaths
Iranian people of Georgian descent
17th-century people of Safavid Iran
Shia Muslims from Georgia (country)
16th-century people of Safavid Iran